Trouble is a 1933 British comedy film directed by Maclean Rogers and starring Sydney Howard, George Curzon and Dorothy Robinson. It was made at British and Dominion Elstree Studios.

Premise
A pair of stewards on a cruise ship manage to foil the plans of jewel thieves.

Cast
 Sydney Howard as Miss Carruthers
 George Curzon as Captain Vansittart
 Dorothy Robinson as Cora Vansittart
 Hope Davy as Miss Carruthers
 Muriel Aked as Miss May
 George Turner as Nobby Clarke
 Wally Patch as Chief Steward
 Betty Shale as Mrs Orpington
 Abraham Sofaer as Al

References

Bibliography
 Low, Rachael. Filmmaking in 1930s Britain. George Allen & Unwin, 1985.
 Wood, Linda. British Films, 1927-1939. British Film Institute, 1986.

External links

1933 films
1933 comedy films
Films directed by Maclean Rogers
British comedy films
British black-and-white films
British and Dominions Studios films
Films shot at Imperial Studios, Elstree
1930s English-language films
1930s British films